The Holy Trinity Cathedral, also known as Armenian Cathedral of the Holy Trinity, is the cathedral church of the Ordinariate for Catholics of Armenian Rite in Romania. It is located in Gherla, Cluj County.

During the eighteenth century, Armenian emigrants from Moldavia entered the city through the authorization of the imperial court in Vienna to escape Protestantism and contributed greatly to the growth of the city, so they built the present cathedral between 1748 and 1776 in Baroque style. The Armenian community received in the Austrian Empire brought a lot of wealth and Emperor Francis I, in gratitude, decided to give them a painting of the imperial gallery in Vienna. The choice fell on Rubens' painting called The Deposition of Christ from the Cross, which is still preserved in the cathedral.

See also
Catholicism in Romania
Holy Trinity Cathedral (disambiguation)

References

Eastern Catholic cathedrals in Romania
Armenian Catholic churches in Romania
Buildings and structures in Gherla
Roman Catholic churches completed in 1776
Historic monuments in Cluj County
Armenian Catholic cathedrals
18th-century Roman Catholic church buildings in Romania